is a 1999 Japanese comedy film directed by Shinobu Yaguchi.

Plot
A young milktoast car rental company driver named Satoru Suzuki (Masanobu Ando) and a mousy nurse named Shizuko Sato (Hikari Ishida) are both in dire need of a confidence boost. Through a string of unbelievable events they meet and then fall into a wealth of yakuza money. They are chased by the monstrous yakuza as well as his stooge like young henchmen.

Release
Adrenaline Drive was released in Japan in 1999 and was shown at the 1999 Toronto International Film Festival. It received a limited release in the United States on May 5, 2000. The film grossed a total of $77,313 on its American wide release.

Reception
Adrenaline Drive was well received by Western critics on its initial release. The film ranking website Rotten Tomatoes reported that 75% of critics had given the film positive reviews, based upon a sample of 20. At Metacritic, which assigns a normalized rating out of 100 to reviews from mainstream critics, the film has received an average score of 69, based on 24 reviews.

Notes

External links
 

1999 films
1990s Japanese-language films
Japanese romantic comedy films
1999 romantic comedy films
1990s crime comedy films
Japanese black comedy films
Japanese road movies
1990s road movies
Yakuza films
1990s Japanese films